Devlin Hope (born 27 April 1990 in Johannesburg, South Africa) is a South African rugby union player, currently playing with English National League 1 side Esher. His regular position is hooker.

Rugby career

After one season at that level, he signed with RFU Championship side London Scottish for the 2016–17 season.

Personal life

Hope is the grandson of English footballer Eddie Lewis.

References

South African rugby union players
Living people
1990 births
Rugby union players from Johannesburg
Rugby union hookers
Falcons (rugby union) players
South African people of English descent
White South African people